Lucy Ursula Griffiths (born 10 October 1986) is an English actress known for her roles as Lady Marian in the BBC drama series Robin Hood (2006–09), as Nora Gainesborough, Eric Northman's vampire "sister", in the HBO horror series True Blood (2012–13) and as Emily Woodrow in the AMC supernatural drama series Preacher (2016).

Life and career

Born in Brighton, Griffiths was educated at Windlesham House School, Roedean School, Dorothy Stringer High School and Varndean College. She is a former member of the National Youth Music Theatre and Youth Music Theatre UK.

She first appeared on television in Sea of Souls and then Sugar Rush, and on stage in The White Devil. In February 2006 it was announced she would be playing a "feisty", beautiful Marian in the BBC family drama series Robin Hood, alongside Jonas Armstrong. Griffiths has said that her character "has been written as an intelligent, witty, biting character, and that's how I expected her to be."

Griffiths returned as Marian in the second series of Robin Hood in 2007, but her character was killed off in the final episode. Though this decision proved unpopular with fans of the series, it is said on a BBC Nottingham page that she left the show to pursue 'other opportunities'. It has been rumored that she wanted to leave the show to further her career in Hollywood. However, other sources say she was written out to allow the show to be taken in a new direction. She returned in the series finale a year later as a spectral vision of Marian.

In 2009, she made her West End debut in a revival of Arcadia and appeared in the ITV1 drama Collision. On 5 September 2010, she appeared in the ITV drama U Be Dead, playing Bethan Ancell and on 1 November 2010 she starred in ITV drama The Little House.

In January 2011, Griffiths signed a talent holding deal with American television network CBS. It had been announced that she would play Jenna Lestrade, the lead in the CW zombie pilot Awakening, however the show did not go ahead.

In November 2011, it was revealed that Griffiths would play Nora, the sister of vampire Eric Northman (Alexander Skarsgård), in the fifth season of HBO's True Blood. Nora is not a character in the Southern Vampire Mysteries (the books the TV series is based on) but she has been described as "intelligent, intimidating, cool under pressure and a very good liar" according to TV Line. During November 2011 Griffiths also appeared on stage at the Finborough Theatre, London, in the play Atman by Iain Finlay Macleod.

She voiced Mabel Dobbs in the Big Finish Productions Doctor Who audio drama The Auntie Matter, which was released in January 2013.

She has a diploma in mime from a world-famous school in Paris and claims that Marcel Marceau was her greatest influence into the artistry of emotions and actions without words. She also admires performances of Judi Dench, Kate Winslet, and Jennifer Saunders.

Griffiths was originally cast in Constantine as the female lead Liv Aberdine, the daughter of a late friend, who comes to discover that she has the ability of seeing the supernatural world among us. She teams up with Constantine to fight the demons who have targeted her and learn more about her late father. Griffiths was dropped after Goyer and Cerone decided to take the series in a different creative direction. Instead, the original comic character Zed was written in. It was later announced that Angélica Celaya would fill the role. Some of Griffiths' final scenes in the pilot were reshot to explain why her character doesn't join Constantine in his adventures, as had been foreshadowed and originally intended.

In April 2015 Griffiths was cast in the AMC series Preacher as Emily Woodrow, a character described as a "no-nonsense" single mother, waitress, church organist, bookkeeper and the loyal right hand of Jesse Custer (Dominic Cooper).

Filmography

Film

Television

Video games

Theatre roles

References

1986 births
21st-century English actresses
English stage actresses
English television actresses
Living people
People educated at Roedean School, East Sussex
Actresses from Brighton
Alumni of British Youth Music Theatre
People educated at Varndean College
People educated at Windlesham House School